Virginia Ellen Simms (May 25, 1913  – April 4, 1994) was an American popular singer and film actress.

Simms sang with big bands and with Dinah Shore, Peggy Lee, Ella Fitzgerald, Jo Stafford, among others. She also worked as an MGM and Universal film actress and appeared in 11 movies from 1939 to 1951, when she retired.

Early life
Simms was born in San Antonio, Texas. Her family moved to California, where she attended Fresno High School and Fresno State Teachers College, where she studied piano. While there, she began performing in campus productions, singing with sorority sisters and forming a popular campus vocal trio. Shortly afterward, she sought a singing career, and by 1932 she had her own program on a local radio station.

Career

Radio
In 1932, Simms became the vocalist for the Tom Gerun band in San Francisco, working together with other vocalists including a young Tony Martin and Woody Herman. In 1934, she joined the Kay Kyser Orchestra, with which she received her first national exposure appearing on radio shows with Kyser.

Films
Simms appeared in three films with Kyser: That's Right—You're Wrong (1939), You'll Find Out (1940), and Playmates (1941).

On April 6, 1941, Simms and Kyser costarred in Niagara to Reno (described as "an original comedy") on CBS radio's Silver Theater. She nearly married Kyser but left his orchestra in September 1941 for her own radio show.

She starred in several more films, including Here We Go Again (1942), Hit the Ice (1943), Broadway Rhythm (1944) and the sanitized Cole Porter biopic Night and Day (1946).

Television
In 1951, Simms hosted a local television show on KTTV Channel 11 in Los Angeles that featured dance bands and talent from military bases around Southern California.

Humanitarian work
Simms entertained troops during World War II, and after the war, she continued to help servicemen. In 1947, a radio station's newsletter noted: "[N]ow she is helping provide new homes for them. Ginny is sponsoring the construction of 450 homes for vets in Los Angeles."

Awards
On June 5, 1993, a Golden Palm Star on the Palm Springs, California Walk of Stars was dedicated to Simms.

Personal life
Simms was married three times. Her first marriage (1945-1951) was to Hyatt Hotels founder Hyatt von Dehn, with whom she had two sons: David (born in July 1946) and Conrad (born December 27, 1949). Her second marriage (1951-1953) was to Bob Calhoun, and her third was to Republican former attorney general of Washington State Don Eastvold from June 22, 1962 until her death in 1994.

Death
Simms died after suffering a heart attack in Palm Springs on April 4, 1994 at the age of 80. Her remains are interred at Desert Memorial Park in Cathedral City, California. She was survived by her husband, Donald Eastvold Sr.

Filmography

Selected discography
Simms recorded extensively—from June 17, 1935 until July 2, 1947, then again in mid-1953 and finally in December 7 & 9, 1960—for several labels, including:
ARA (American Recording Artists),
Brunswick,
Capitol Custom,
Columbia,
Conqueror,
Okeh,
Regal Zonophone,
Royale,
Sonora,
Star-Tone,
TOPS,
Venise,
Vocalion
and V-Disc.

Some of these recordings have been rereleased on CD:
 Ginny Simms: Love Is Here to Stay (1997)
 Ginny Simms: V-Disc Recordings CD (1998)
 Gorgeous Ginny Simms (1999)
 Night and Day (1999) (Soundtrack of the 1946 film Night and Day)
 Ginny Simms: I'd Like to Set You to Music (2001)
 Simple & Sweet: The Best of Ginny Simms (2005)
 Ginny Simms: One More Dream (2006)
 All Right With Me! – 30 Years of Cole Porter Magic with the Girls! (2010) – Simms sings two Porter songs: "What Is This Thing Called Love?" and "Easy to Love"
 On the Air With Ginny Simms (2011)
 The Sentimental Stylings of Ginny Simms (2012)

Notes

References

External links

 Ginny Simms biography Retrieved 26 May 2016.
 "The career of Ginny Simms" discography Retrieved 26 May 2016.
  Retrieved 11 October 2007.
  Retrieved 28 November 2007.
 Ginny Simms discography at cduniverse Retrieved 26 May 2016.
 Ginny Simms discography at discogs Retrieved 26 May 2016.

1913 births
1994 deaths
Singers from Texas
American film actresses
Big band singers
Burials at Desert Memorial Park
Metro-Goldwyn-Mayer contract players
People from San Antonio
20th-century American actresses
20th-century American singers
20th-century American women singers